

Gmina Drawsko Pomorskie is an urban-rural gmina (administrative district) in Drawsko County, West Pomeranian Voivodeship, in north-western Poland.

Villages
Apart from the town of Drawsko Pomorskie, Gmina Drawsko Pomorskie contains the villages and settlements of Cianowo, Dalewo, Gajewko, Gajewo, Golina, Gudowo, Jankowo, Karwice, Konotop, Krzynno, Kumki, Łabędzie, Lasocin, Linowno, Mielenko Drawskie, Nętno, Olchowiec, Oleszno, Paprotno, Roztoki, Rydzewo, Suliszewo, Ustok, Woliczno, Zagórki, Zagozd, Zarańsko, Zbrojewo, Ziemsko, Żółcin, Żołędowo and Żółte.

Neighbouring gminas
Gmina Drawsko Pomorskie is bordered by the gminas of Brzeżno, Dobrzany, Ińsko, Kalisz Pomorski, Łobez, Ostrowice, Węgorzyno and Złocieniec.

References
Polish official population figures 2006

Drawsko Pomorskie
Drawsko County